František Bartoš (10 May 1926 – 21 January 1987) was a Czechoslovakian Grand Prix motorcycle road racer. He enjoyed his best season as a rider for the ČZ factory racing team in 1957, when he finished the season in ninth place in the 125cc world championship.

Motorcycle Grand Prix results 

(key) (Races in italics indicate fastest lap)

References 

1926 births
1987 deaths
Czechoslovak motorcycle racers
Czech motorcycle racers
125cc World Championship riders
250cc World Championship riders
Isle of Man TT riders